The Eldorado Research Institute (In Portuguese: Instituto de Pesquisas Eldorado) is a non-profit research, development and innovation institution with its headquarters located in Campinas, São Paulo, Brazil. And branches in Brasília, Federal Capital, Porto Alegre, capital of Rio Grande do Sul state and Manaus, capital of Amazonas state. It was founded in 1999. It is located in the high tech area known as Brazilian Silicon Valley.

Activities and resources
The Institute is active in research and development, project management, software engineering, product engineering, testing and qualification of software and hardware products and processes and training and education programs.

For these purposes, it maintains several laboratories for testing, safety standards, acoustics, radio frequency, etc.

The Institute has technological partnerships with companies such as Dell, Borland, Citrix, Intel, Mentor Graphics, Microsoft, Motorola, Sun Microsystems and IBM.

Research institutes in Brazil
Organisations based in Campinas